Triniteurybia aberrans, the Idaho goldenweed, is a species of flowering plant in the tribe Astereae within the family Asteraceae. It is the only species in the genus Triniteurybia.

Triniteurybia aberrans is native to the United States, in the Sawtooth Mountains of Idaho and the Bitterroot Range of Montana.

References

Astereae
Monotypic Asteraceae genera
Flora of Idaho
Flora of Montana